Les Stephens (24 October 1898 – 14 June 1958) was an  Australian rules footballer who played with Geelong in the Victorian Football League (VFL).

Notes

External links 

1898 births
1958 deaths
Australian rules footballers from Victoria (Australia)
Geelong Football Club players